Donald Harrisville Juel (March 4, 1942 – February 23, 2003) was an American educator and New Testament scholar.

Donald Harrisville Juel was born in Alton, Illinois. His education included  B.A. from St. Olaf College (1964),  B.D. from Luther Seminary (1968), and  Ph.D. in New Testament from Yale University (1973).

He was Richard J. Dearborn Professor of New Testament Theology at Princeton Theological Seminary from 1995 until his death. He had previously taught at Indiana University (1972–1974) and had served as Professor of New Testament at Luther Seminary (1978 to 1995).

Juel was a member of the Society for the Study of the New Testament and the Society of Biblical Literature. In 2005, a Festschrift was published in his memory. Edited by Beverly Roberts Gaventa and Patrick D. Miller, The Ending of Mark and the Ends of God consists of reflections on and responses to an article that Juel had written on the ending of Mark's gospel.(Louisville, KY: Westminster John Knox Press.  )

Selected works

References

1942 births
2003 deaths
People from Alton, Illinois
American biblical scholars
New Testament scholars
St. Olaf College alumni
Luther Seminary alumni
Yale University alumni
American Lutherans
Princeton Theological Seminary faculty
Lutheran biblical scholars
20th-century Lutherans